Sanjay Haribhau Jadhav, commonly known as Bandu Jadhav, is a politician with Shiv Sena from Parbhani in the Maharashtra state of India.

He was elected twice, in 2004 and 2009, as MLA from Parbhani Vidhan Sabha constituency. And he was elected twice, in 2014 and 2019, as MP from Parbhani Lok Sabha constituency.

.

Positions held
 2004: Elected to Maharashtra Vidhan Sabha from Parbhani
 2009: Elected to Maharashtra Legislative Assembly again from Parbhani
 2014: Elected to 16th Lok Sabha from Parbhani Lok Sabha
 2019: Elected to 17th Lok Sabha

See also
 Lok Sabha

References

External links
 Shiv Sena Home Page 
 Official biographical sketch in Parliament of India website

People from Parbhani district
1967 births
Marathi politicians
Maharashtra MLAs 2009–2014
Living people
India MPs 2014–2019
Shiv Sena politicians
Lok Sabha members from Maharashtra
People from Marathwada
Maharashtra municipal councillors
People from Parbhani
Maharashtra MLAs 2004–2009